Songhyeon Station is a station of Daegu Metro Line 1 in Dalseo-gu Daegu, South Korea.

Year-The Number of Passengers

External links
 Cyber station information from Daegu Metropolitan Transit Corporation

Dalseo District
Railway stations opened in 1997
Daegu Metro stations